The 1974–75 Centenary Gents basketball team represented Centenary College of Louisiana as an NCAA Division I Independent during the 1974–75 college basketball season. The team was coached by Larry Little and played their home games at Gold Dome in Shreveport, Louisiana. Led by junior center Robert Parish, future Naismith Memorial Basketball Hall of Fame and College Basketball Hall of Fame inductee, the Gents finished with an overall record of 25–4.

Roster

Schedule and results

|-
!colspan=9 style=| Regular Season

Rankings

Awards and honors
Robert Parish – Third-Team All-American (NABC), Honorable Mention All-American (AP)

References 

Centenary Gentlemen basketball seasons
Centenary
Centenary
Centenary